{{Infobox person
| image              = Christopher Titus.JPG
| caption            = Titus in 2010
| name               = Christopher Titus
| birth_name         = Christopher Todd Titus
| birth_date    = 1964 
| birth_place        = Castro Valley, California, U.S.
| occupation         = Comedian, actor, podcaster | spouse             = 
| children           = 2
| nationality        = American
| years_active       = 1984–present
| website            = 
}}

Christopher Todd Titus (born 1964) is an American comedian, podcaster and actor. He grew up in Newark, California. Titus came to network audiences with the eponymous FOX series Titus, of which he was the star, executive producer and co-creator. He is also a stand-up comedian whose act revolves around his dysfunctional family and shocking life experiences.

Career
Stand-up comedy

Norman Rockwell is Bleeding

Titus' first special, this monologue about his dysfunctional family was the basis for his TV show. This special premiered in 2000 at the Montreal Just for Laughs festival.  

5th Annual End of the World Tour

This special was filmed in Miami for Comedy Central.

Love is EvolLove is Evol deals with his divorce from Erin (renamed "Kate" in the special for legal reasons) whom he stated was turned into "a demon slithering from the fiery depths of Satan's anus" during the divorce proceedings, and the toll that abusive relationships take on people, among other things. In it, he talks about how his marriage to Erin fell apart, the ensuing divorce, his analysis of why people stay in bad relationships, his crisis of faith because of the divorce, meeting his new girlfriend's family, and dating again for the first time in two decades. It was recorded in October 2008 for Comedy Central and aired on February 14, 2009.

Neverlution

Titus' fourth stand-up act Neverlution debuted at the Montreal Comedy Festival in 2010 to standing ovations. In it, Titus talked about bringing the country back to its former glory, the new generation, and politics. Comedy Central Records released a double CD of Neverlution on June 28, 2011, and the special aired on Comedy Central on July 3, 2011. The 105-minute Neverlution DVD was available for pre-order on August 3, 2011, and shipped on August 15, 2011.

The Voice in My Head

Titus' fifth stand-up act is called The Voice in My Head. It was originally called Scarred for Life, but was changed in November 2012 to Epic Fail, until it was changed again to The Voice in My Head in January 2013. This special deals with the different levels of failure and success Titus has encountered throughout his life, including his first job as a low-rent Darth Vader lookalike, up to why his TV show was cancelled. It was filmed on January 26, 2013, at the Fresno Tower Theatre and was released for sale on his website on April 1, 2013, with 10% of the profit going towards The Insight Youth Project for homeless teens.

Angry Pursuit of Happiness

Titus' sixth act was called Angry Pursuit of Happiness which was filmed on September 27, 2014, in Santa Barbara,  and was put on sale on his website on December 5, 2014.

Born with a Defect 

This is his seventh special and was filmed in Center Theater in Escondido, California, and was released in 2016. "If you have kids it's therapy, if you don't have kids it's 90 minutes of birth control".

Amerigeddon 

Titus' eighth act was released in 2018 and dealt with America under the Trump administration.

Carrying Monsters

Titus' ninth act is currently on tour in the USA.

Podcast
Since January 28, 2011, Christopher Titus has been co-hosting the self-titled Christopher Titus Podcast with his wife Bombshell Rae (Rachel Bradley). Stuntman Tommy, an old friend of Titus, who also did stunt work on the TV show Titus, was a co-host until October of 2012. "Nerdpunk" Jeff Fox, who has also worked with the Adam Carolla Network, had a co-hosting stint until leaving in January of 2014. Willie "Jello" Johnson, Titus' half brother, took over as the third voice on the show until he was revealed to be a fictional character voiced by Christopher Titus himself. In 2019, The Hylinder (Ken Hylind) who produces the podcast took over as the third voice/co-host of the show. Being a singer and musician, Titus and Bombshell Rae would make The Hylinder sing a new outro each week until 2022 when they switched the format to a fun fact since they "ran out of music genres."

Filmography

Film

Television

Discography
 Norman Rockwell is Bleeding (2004) Comedy Central Records
 The Fifth Annual End of The World Tour (2007) Comedy Central Records
 Love Is Evol (2009) Comedy Central Records
 Neverlution (2011) Comedy Central Records
 Voice in My Head (2013) DVD Exclusive
 Angry Pursuit of Happiness (2015)
 Born With a Defect (2016)
 Amerigeddon (2018)
 Carrying Monsters (2020)
 Zero Side Effects'' (2022)

References

External links

 
 
 

Living people
1964 births
20th-century American comedians
20th-century American male actors
21st-century American comedians
21st-century American male actors
American male television actors
American stand-up comedians
Comedians from California
Male actors from California
People from Castro Valley, California
People from Newark, California